The chestnut long-tongued bat (Lionycteris spurrelli) is a bat species from South and Central America. It is the only species within its genus.

References

Bats of South America
Bats of Brazil
Mammals of Colombia
Phyllostomidae
Mammals described in 1913
Taxa named by Oldfield Thomas